Experience 7 was a  Guadeloupean kadans band formed in the mid-1970s, led by Guy Houllier and Yves Honore. However, unlike Kassav' or Malavoi, the small band produced most songs with Henry Debs in Guadeloupe.

Biography

Career
The group was created in 1976 by Guy Houllier and Yves Honore added that the successes such as "LA OLA Mizik YE" and "PLAS BAY LI". It also represents the great Romantic era marked by immortal love songs as "Whilfried", "Vivre pour toi", "Isabelle" ... and other tunes with "Carmelina", "Lanmou sé on danjé". Indeed, they have the audacity, in the Carnival (1983), is an album of "straining your" winning a huge success as it was unexpected. But with "Goudjoua" and especially Roro, that was the first hit to reach the national charts, they are not forgotten about the explosive atmosphere that it gives off. As memorable as the Hurricane Hugo, the song "Sois belle" becomes a hymn to the hope of rebirth of Guadeloupe as they were the ambassadors around the world. They have indeed raised the flag of Guadeloupe in Europe, Suriname, Martinique, Guyane, Haiti, Réunion, French Polynesia, Seychelles, New Caledonia, throughout West Africa, Canada and the United States.

Musical Style
Through the years, Experience 7 used various styles of Caribbean music from mid 1970 to very late 2000. Those songs have spanned genres as diverse as biguine, cadence-lypso, kadans/compas.

Influences
The work done to bring the group Zouk Machine, the band leaders create and composed, to the highest steps of the charts international (including the famous title Maldon), made them somewhat let the band.

Late career
With the pressure from their fans, drives them to reoffend after 1995, when Zouk Machine split. They realize then three zouk-love or compas albums on which emerge from songs like "Pou Vou" (1996), "Sirena" (1997), "Extreme tendresse" (1998).

The 21st century saw the creation of Guy Houllier solo album called "Tendans" that takes three SACEM prizes, rewarding the 25-year career of the Guadeloupean "crooner" in 2001.

Discography 

 1976 : Experimental Whilfried
 1977 : Vivre pour toi
 1978 : Osibisa
 1978 : Isabelle
 1979 : Adieu Carmélina
 1980 : Banzaï
 1981 : Siw Bizwen Milyon
 1983 : Je reviendrais
 1984 : Tendrement vôtre
 1985 : Diva
 1985 : Roro
 1987 : Goudjoua
 1990 : Sois belle
 1996 : Zouk N'Love
 1997 : Sirena
 1998 : Extreme tendresse
 2001 : Tendans (Album solo) Guy Houllier
 2008 : Mistè lanmou

External links

References

Guadeloupean musical groups
Musical groups established in 1976
Zouk musicians
1976 establishments in Guadeloupe